James Henniger (8 July 1954 – 29 September 2004) was a Canadian rower. He competed in the men's eight event at the 1976 Summer Olympics.

References

1954 births
2004 deaths
Canadian male rowers
Olympic rowers of Canada
Rowers at the 1976 Summer Olympics
Rowers from Vancouver
Pan American Games medalists in rowing
Pan American Games silver medalists for Canada
Rowers at the 1975 Pan American Games
20th-century Canadian people